Ephemeral Fantasia, known in Japan as , is a 2000 role-playing video game developed by Konami Computer Entertainment Japan and published by Konami for the PlayStation 2. The game was released in Japan on August 10, 2000, in North America on July 9, 2001 and in Europe on September 7, 2001.

Gameplay
Ephemeral Fantasia features traditional role-playing video game turn-based battles, with a variety of playable characters and skills. Additionally, there is a guitar mini-game that can be played several times throughout the course of the story.

Plot 
Ephemeral Fantasia is similar to The Legend of Zelda: Majora's Mask in that the story transpires over a constantly looping period of five days. This is caused by a time loop created by the main antagonist, Xelpherpolis. In order for the time loop to be halted, Mouse must travel through the same five days multiple times.

This game follows Mouse, who has been summoned by a powerful figure on a remote island to compose a song. Xelpherpolis invites Mouse to play at his wedding, no doubt because of his fame as an excellent musician. Of course, Xelpherpolis doesn't expect him to solve the mystery of the island and free its inhabitants.

Development 
Ephemeral Fantasia was originally to be released on the Sega Dreamcast. An interview with development team member Makoto "M2" Moribe of Famitsu revealed that additional content planned for the Dreamcast version was cut when the game was moved to PS2.

Reception 

The game received "generally unfavorable reviews" according to the review aggregation website Metacritic. Francesca Reyes of NextGen said of the game, "Don't be fooled by the cute characters on the box promising console RPG goodness. You'll find none of that here. Keep moving."

References

External links 
 

2000 video games
Cancelled Dreamcast games
Konami games
PlayStation 2 games
PlayStation 2-only games
Role-playing video games
Video games about time loops
Video games developed in Japan